René Ildefonse Dordillon (born in 1808 in Sainte-Maure-de-Touraine) was a French clergyman and bishop for the Roman Catholic Diocese of Taiohae. He was appointed bishop in 1855. He died in 1888.

References 

1808 births
1888 deaths
French Roman Catholic bishops
Roman Catholic bishops of Taiohae